The City Park/Pepsi Tennis Center is a tennis facility located in City Park in New Orleans, United States. The facility, built in 2011, serves as the home of the Loyola Wolf Pack and Tulane Green Wave tennis teams.

The facility offers 26 lighted courts. It has 16 hard courts and 10 clay courts along with a practice court and a club house. The club house is 3,500 square feet and includes a meeting room, showers and lockers.

The tennis center hosts the City Park Grand Slam Tennis Tournament and has hosted the Allstate Sugar Bowl Tennis Tournament.

History of City Park tennis facilities
In 1922, City Park had a tennis facility with 17 courts.

Gallery

See also
City Park (New Orleans)
Loyola Wolf Pack
Tulane Green Wave

References

External links
Official website

College tennis venues in the United States
Loyola Wolf Pack
Tulane Green Wave sports venues
Tennis venues in New Orleans
Sports venues completed in 2011
2011 establishments in Louisiana